Slavko Ištvanić  (born 12 July 1966 in Zagreb) is a retired Croatian professional footballer who played over 200 league matches for NK Dinamo Zagreb in the Croatian Prva HNL.

International career
Ištvanić made his debut for Croatia in a June 1991 friendly match against Slovenia and earned a total of 3 caps, scoring no goals. His first was not official, though, since Croatia was still part of Yugoslavia at the time. His final international was an April 1994 friendly away against Slovakia.

References

External links
 
 

1965 births
Living people
Footballers from Zagreb
Association football defenders
Yugoslav footballers
Croatian footballers
Croatia international footballers
GNK Dinamo Zagreb players
HNK Segesta players
NK Croatia Sesvete players
NK Novalja players
Yugoslav First League players
Croatian Football League players
First Football League (Croatia) players
Second Football League (Croatia) players